Tchibanga Airport  is an airport serving the city of Tchibanga, in the Nyanga Province of Gabon.

The Tchibanga non-directional beacon (Ident: TC) is located on the field.

Airlines and destinations

See also

 List of airports in Gabon
 Transport in Gabon

References

External links
Google Maps - Tchibanga
Tchibanga Airport
OpenStreetMap - Tchibanga
OurAirports - Tchibanga

Airports in Gabon